Integrated information theory (IIT) attempts to provide a framework capable of explaining why some physical systems (such as human brains) are conscious, why they feel the particular way they do in particular states (e.g. why our visual field appears extended when we gaze out at the night sky), and what it would take for other physical systems to be conscious (Are other animals conscious? Might the whole Universe be?). In principle, once the theory is mature and has been tested extensively in controlled conditions, the IIT framework may be capable of providing a concrete inference about whether any physical system is conscious, to what degree it is conscious, and what particular experience it is having. In IIT, a system's consciousness (what it is like subjectively) is conjectured to be identical to its causal properties (what it is like objectively). Therefore it should be possible to account for the conscious experience of a physical system by unfolding its complete causal powers (see Central identity).

IIT was proposed by neuroscientist Giulio Tononi in 2004. The latest version of the theory, labeled IIT 3.0, was published in 2014. However, the theory is still in development, as is evident from the later publications improving on the formalism presented in IIT 3.0.

Overview

Relationship to the "hard problem of consciousness" 
David Chalmers has argued that any attempt to explain consciousness in purely physical terms (i.e. to start with the laws of physics as they are currently formulated and derive the necessary and inevitable existence of consciousness) eventually runs into the so-called "hard problem". Rather than try to start from physical principles and arrive at consciousness, IIT "starts with consciousness" (accepts the existence of our own consciousness as certain) and reasons about the properties that a postulated physical substrate would need to have in order to account for it. The ability to perform this jump from phenomenology to mechanism rests on IIT's assumption that if the formal properties of a conscious experience can be fully accounted for by an underlying physical system, then the properties of the physical system must be constrained by the properties of the experience. The limitations on the physical system for consciousness to exist are unknown and consciousness may exist on a spectrum, as implied by studies involving split brain patients and conscious patients with large amounts of brain matter missing.

Specifically, IIT moves from phenomenology to mechanism by attempting to identify the essential properties of conscious experience (dubbed "axioms") and, from there, the essential properties of conscious physical systems (dubbed "postulates").

Axioms: essential properties of experience 

The axioms are intended to capture the essential aspects of every conscious experience. Every axiom should apply to every possible experience.

The wording of the axioms has changed slightly as the theory has developed, and the most recent and complete statement of the axioms is as follows:

Postulates: properties required of the physical substrate 
The axioms describe regularities in conscious experience, and IIT seeks to explain these regularities. What could account for the fact that every experience exists, is structured, is differentiated, is unified, and is definite? IIT argues that the existence of an underlying causal system with these same properties offers the most parsimonious explanation. Thus a physical system, if conscious, is so by virtue of its causal properties.

The properties required of a conscious physical substrate are called the "postulates," since the existence of the physical substrate is itself only postulated (remember, IIT maintains that the only thing one can be sure of is the existence of one's own consciousness). In what follows, a "physical system" is taken to be a set of elements, each with two or more internal states, inputs that influence that state, and outputs that are influenced by that state (neurons or logic gates are the natural examples). Given this definition of "physical system", the postulates are:

Mathematics: formalization of the postulates 
For a complete and thorough account of the mathematical formalization of IIT, see reference. What follows is intended as a brief summary, adapted from, of the most important quantities involved. Pseudocode for the algorithms used to calculate these quantities can be found at reference. For a visual illustration of the algorithm, see the supplementary material of the paper describing the PyPhi toolbox.

A system refers to a set of elements, each with two or more internal states, inputs that influence that state, and outputs that are influenced by that state. A mechanism refers to a subset of system elements. The mechanism-level quantities below are used to assess the integration of any given mechanism, and the system-level quantities are used to assess the integration of sets of mechanisms ("sets of sets").

In order to apply the IIT formalism to a system, its full transition probability matrix (TPM) must be known. The TPM specifies the probability with which any state of a system transitions to any other system state. Each of the following quantities is calculated in a bottom-up manner from the system's TPM.

Cause-effect space 
For a system of  simple binary elements, cause-effect space is formed by  axes, one for each possible past and future state of the system. If a point is also taken to have a scalar magnitude (which can be informally thought of as the point's "size", for example), then it can easily represent a concept: The concept's cause-effect repertoire specifies the location of the point in cause-effect space, and the concept's  value specifies that point's magnitude.

In this way, a conceptual structure  can be plotted as a constellation of points in cause-effect space. Each point is called a star, and each star's magnitude is its size.

Central identity 
IIT addresses the mind-body problem by proposing an identity between phenomenological properties of experience and causal properties of physical systems: The conceptual structure specified by a complex of elements in a state is identical to its experience.

Specifically, the form of the conceptual structure in cause-effect space completely specifies the quality of the experience, while the irreducibility  of the conceptual structure specifies the level to which it exists (i.e., the complex's level of consciousness).  The maximally irreducible cause-effect repertoire of each concept within a conceptual structure specifies what the concept contributes to the quality of the experience, while its irreducibility  specifies how much the concept is present in the experience.

According to IIT, an experience is thus an intrinsic property of a complex of mechanisms in a state.

Extensions 
The calculation of even a modestly-sized system's  is often computationally intractable, so efforts have been made to develop heuristic or proxy measures of integrated information. These are related to proxy measures developed earlier by Anil Seth and Adam Barrett. However, none of these proxy measures have a mathematically proven relationship to the actual  value, which complicates the interpretation of analyses that use them. They can give qualitatively different results even for very small systems.

In 2021, Angus Leung and colleagues published a direct application of IIT's mathematical formalism to neural data. To circumvent the computational challenges associated with larger datasets, the authors focused on neuronal population activity in the fly. The study showed that  can readily be computed for smaller sets of neural data. Moreover, matching IIT's predictions, was significantly decreased when the animals underwent general anesthesia. 

A significant computational challenge in calculating integrated information is finding the minimum information partition of a neural system, which requires iterating through all possible network partitions. To solve this problem, Daniel Toker and Friedrich T. Sommer have shown that the spectral decomposition of the correlation matrix of a system's dynamics is a quick and robust proxy for the minimum information partition.

Related experimental work 
While the algorithm for assessing a system's  and conceptual structure is relatively straightforward, its high time complexity makes it computationally intractable for many systems of interest. Heuristics and approximations can sometimes be used to provide ballpark estimates of a complex system's integrated information, but precise calculations are often impossible. These computational challenges, combined with the already difficult task of reliably and accurately assessing consciousness under experimental conditions, make testing many of the theory's predictions difficult.

Despite these challenges, researchers have attempted to use measures of information integration and differentiation to assess levels of consciousness in a variety of subjects.

IIT also makes several predictions which fit well with existing experimental evidence, and can be used to explain some counterintuitive findings in consciousness research. For example, IIT can be used to explain why some brain regions, such as the cerebellum do not appear to contribute to consciousness, despite their size and/or functional importance.

Reception 

Integrated information theory has received both broad criticism and support.

Support 
Neuroscientist Christof Koch, who has helped to develop later versions of the theory, has called IIT "the only really promising fundamental theory of consciousness".  Technologist and Koch's ex-student Virgil Griffith says "IIT is currently the leading theory of consciousness."  However, his answer to whether IIT is exactly the right theory is ‘Probably not’.

Neuroscientist and consciousness researcher Anil Seth is supportive of the theory, with some caveats, claiming that "conscious experiences are highly informative and always integrated."; and that "One thing that immediately follows from [IIT] is that you have a nice post hoc explanation for certain things we know about consciousness.". But he also claims "the parts of IIT that I find less promising are where it claims that integrated information actually is consciousness — that there’s an identity between the two.", and has criticized the panpsychist extrapolations of the theory.

Philosopher David Chalmers, famous for the idea of the hard problem of consciousness, has expressed some enthusiasm about IIT. According to Chalmers, IIT is a development in the right direction, whether or not it is correct.

Physicist Max Tegmark has also expressed some support for the approach taken by IIT, and considers it compatible with his own ideas about consciousness as a "state of matter".  Tegmark has also tried to address the problem of the computational complexity behind the calculations. According to Max Tegmark “the integration measure proposed by IIT is computationally infeasible to evaluate for large systems, growing super-exponentially with the system’s information content.” As a result, Φ can only be approximated in general. However, different ways of approximating Φ provide radically different results. Other works have shown that Φ can be computed in some large mean-field neural network models, although some assumptions of the theory have to be revised to capture phase transitions in these large systems.

Criticism 
One criticism made is that the claims of IIT as a theory of consciousness “are not scientifically established or testable at the moment”. However, while it is true that the complete analysis suggested by IIT cannot be completed at the moment for human brains, IIT has already been applied to models of visual cortex to explain why visual space feels the way it does.

Neuroscientists Björn Merker, David Rudrauf and Philosopher Kenneth Williford co-authored a paper criticizing IIT on several grounds. Firstly, by not demonstrating that all members of systems which do in fact combine integration and differentiation in the formal IIT sense are conscious, systems which demonstrate high levels of integration and differentiation of information might provide the necessary conditions for consciousness but those combinations of attributes do not amount to the conditions for consciousness. Secondly that the measure, Φ, reflects efficiency of global information transfer rather than level of consciousness, and that the correlation of Φ with level of consciousness through different states of wakefulness (e.g. awake, dreaming and dreamless sleep, anesthesia, seizures and coma) actually reflect the level of efficient network interactions performed for cortical engagement. Hence Φ reflects network efficiency rather than consciousness, which would be one of the functions served by cortical network efficiency. Of course, IIT emphasizes the importance of all five postulates being satisfied (not just information and integration) and does not claim that Φ is identical to consciousness, undermining the authors credibility on the topic of IIT and leaving their main criticism hamstrung. 
  
Neuroscientist Michael Graziano, proponent of the competing attention schema theory, rejects IIT as pseudoscience. He claims IIT is a "magicalist theory" that has "no chance of scientific success or understanding".

Theoretical computer scientist Scott Aaronson has criticized IIT by demonstrating through its own formulation that an inactive series of logic gates, arranged in the correct way, would not only be conscious but be “unboundedly more conscious than humans are.” Tononi himself agrees with the assessment and argues that according to IIT, an even simpler arrangement of inactive logic gates, if large enough, would also be conscious. However he further argues that this is a strength of IIT rather than a weakness, because that's exactly the sort of cytoarchitecture followed by large portions of the cerebral cortex, specially at the back of the brain, which is the most likely neuroanatomical correlate of consciousness according to some reviews.

A peer-reviewed commentary by 58 scholars involved in the scientific study of consciousness rejects these conclusions about logic gates as “mysterious and unfalsifiable claims” that should be distinguished from “empirically productive hypotheses”. IIT as a scientific theory of consciousness has been criticized in the scientific literature as only able to be “either false or unscientific” by its own definitions. IIT has also been denounced by other members of the consciousness field as requiring “an unscientific leap of faith”, but it is not clear that this is in fact the case if the theory is properly understood.  The theory has also been derided for failing to answer the basic questions required of a theory of consciousness.  Philosopher Adam Pautz says “As long as proponents of IIT do not address these questions, they have not put a clear theory on the table that can be evaluated as true or false.”

Influential philosopher John Searle has given a critique of theory saying "The theory implies panpsychism" and "The problem with panpsychism is not that it is false; it does not get up to the level of being false. It is strictly speaking meaningless because no clear notion has been given to the claim.". However, whether or not a theory has panpsychist implications (that all or most of what exists physically must be, be part of something that is, or be composed of parts that are, conscious) has no bearing on the scientific validity of the theory. Searle's take has also been countered by other philosophers, for misunderstanding and misrepresenting a theory that is actually resonant with his own ideas.

The mathematics of IIT have also been criticized since “having a high Φ value requires highly specific structures that are unstable to minor perturbations”.  This susceptibility to minor perturbations seems inconsistent with empirical results about neuroplasticity in the human brain, and thus weakening the theory. However, the systems investigated by Schwitzgebel were small networks of logic gates, and not human brains in normal waking conditions, and the generalizability to systems about which we have access to verified conscious experience (human beings) is questionable.

Philosopher Tim Bayne has criticized the axiomatic foundations of the theory. He concludes that “the so-called ‘axioms’ that Tononi et al. appeal to fail to qualify as genuine axioms”.

See also 

 Causality
 Consciousness
 Hard problem of consciousness
 Mind–body problem
 Neural correlates of consciousness
 Phenomenology (philosophy)
 Phenomenology (psychology)
 Philosophy of mind
 Qualia
 Sentience

References

External links

Related papers 
 
 
 
 Integrated Information Theory: An Updated Account (2012) (First presentation of IIT 3.0)

Websites 
 integratedinformationtheory.org: resource for learning about IIT; features a graphical user interface to PyPhi.

Software 
 PyPhi: an open-source Python package for calculating integrated information. 

Graphical user interface
Documentation

Books 
The Feeling of Life Itself: Why Consciousness is Widespread but Can't Be Computed by Christof Koch (2019)
Phi: A Voyage from the Brain to the Soul by Giulio Tononi (2012)

News articles 
 New Scientist (2019): How does consciousness work? A radical theory has mind-blowing answers
Nautilus (2017): Is Matter Conscious?
 Aeon (2016): Consciousness creep
 MIT Technology Review (2014): What It Will Take for Computers to Be Conscious
 Wired (2013): A Neuroscientist's Radical Theory of How Networks Become Conscious
 The New Yorker (2013): How Much Consciousness Does an iPhone Have?
 New York Times (2010): Sizing Up Consciousness by Its Bits
  Scientific American (2009): A "Complex" Theory of Consciousness
 IEEE Spectrum (2008): A Bit of Theory: Consciousness as Integrated Information Theory

Talks 
 David Chalmers (2014): How do you explain consciousness?
 Christof Koch (2014): The Integrated Information Theory of Consciousness

Consciousness studies
Information theory
Computational neuroscience